was a city in Kumamoto Prefecture, Japan. The city was founded on April 1, 1954.

On March 27, 2006, Hondo was merged with the city of Ushibuka and the towns of Amakusa, Ariake, Goshoura, Itsuwa, Kawaura, Kuratake, Shinwa and Sumoto (all from Amakusa District) to create the new city of Amakusa and no longer exists as an independent municipality of Japan.

External links
 Official website of Amakusa 

Dissolved municipalities of Kumamoto Prefecture